The Margaret Oakley Dayhoff Award from the Biophysical Society in Rockville, Maryland, is given to a woman who "holds very high promise or has achieved prominence while developing the early stages of a career in biophysical research". It is "one of the top national honors" in biophysics.  The award was established in 1984 in honor of Margaret Dayhoff, a biophysicist associated with the Biophysical Society and the National Biomedical Research Foundation.

Award recipients
Source: Biophysical Society
 1984/85: Dagmar Ringe and Bonnie Ann Wallace
 1985/86: Barbara A. Lewis
 1986/87: Barbara E. Ehrlich
 1987/88: Rachel E. Klevit
 1988/89: Nancy L. Thompson
 1989/90: Anne Walter
 1990/91: Jeanne Rudzki Small
 1991/92: Hazel M. Holden and Francine R. Smith
 1992/93: Carol Vandenberg
 1993/94: Jean S. Baum
 1994/95: Hillary C. M. Nelson
 1995/96: Lynne Regan
 1996/97: Susan Marqusee
 1997/98: Bonnie Anne Berger
 1998/99: Judith R. Mourant
 1999: Lydia Gregoret
 2000/2001: Millie M. Georgiadis and Ka Yee Christina Lee
 2002: Gina MacDonald
 2003: Hao Wu
 2004: Dorothee Kern
 2005: Sarah Keller
 2006: Anne Hinderliter
 2007: Kalina Hristova
 2008: Judith Klein-Seetharaman
 2009: Teresa Giraldez, Adrienne L. Fairhall, and Jin Zhang
 2010: Crina Nimigean and Maria Spies
 2011: Diane Lidke
 2012: Lucy R. Forrest
 2013: Jennifer L. Ross and Katherine Henzler-Wildman
 2014: Sarah Veatch
 2015: Antonina Roll-Mecak
 2016: Sophie Dumont and Polina Lishko
 2017: Julie S. Biteen
 2018: Carrie L. Partch
 2019: Meytal Landau
 2020: Valeria Vásquez
 2021: Randy Stockbridge
 2022: Gabriela Schlau-Cohen

See also

 List of biology awards
 List of prizes, medals, and awards for women in science
 Prizes named after people

Notes

External links  
 Margaret Oakley Dayhoff Award page
 Dayhoff Award, NLM

American science and technology awards
Awards established in 1984
Biophysics awards
Science awards honoring women